Daniel "Chip" Jones (born 5 December 1979) is a Dutch retired basketball player. He played in 41 games for the Netherlands national basketball team after making his debut on 19 November 2000.
Jones played for Dutch Basketball League teams Den Bosch, Den Helder, West-Brabant Giants, Rotterdam Basketbal College and Virtus Werkendam in his career.

References

External links
 eurobasket.com profile

1979 births
Living people
Dutch men's basketball players
Dutch Basketball League players
People from Tegelen
Heroes Den Bosch players
West-Brabant Giants players
Feyenoord Basketball players
Den Helder Kings players
Forwards (basketball)
Sportspeople from Limburg (Netherlands)
21st-century Dutch people